Jerry Moriarty (born January 15, 1938, in Binghamton, New York) is an American artist and teacher at the School of Visual Arts (SVA) in Manhattan. He describes himself as a "paintoonist".

Education and career 
Moriarty entered the Pratt Institute in 1956 and earned a BFA in 1960. After graduating he worked as a freelance magazine illustrator to support his Abstract Expressionist painting. He gave up abstraction in 1963 and starting his teaching career at the School of Visual Arts.

Moriarty had his first one-man show in 1974 in SoHo. Subsequently, he has featured in exhibitions in Chelsea in 1984, at the SVA Museum in 1999 and at CUE Art Foundation in 2004". He received a NEA grant in 1977.

His cartoonist work Jack Survives was first published in the first number of Art Spiegelman´s RAW (magazine) in 1980, featured in later issues and first collected as a RAW-One-Shot, No. 3, in 1984. In 2009, at the age of 71, he published The Complete Jack Survives with Buenaventura Press.

Other projects include A Visual Crime, four double-page illustrations accompanied with a short story in the 1990 anthology Gin & Comix and the Sally's Surprise series of multi-panel paintings.

Chris Ware credited him for "introducing solemnity and eternity in a medium that normally trades in the snappy and the lurid".

References

External links
dailycrosshatch interview
CUE Art Foundation exhibition
CUE Art Foundation exhibition. Artist's statement
Inkstuds audio interview of Jerry Moriarty, September 2009  part 1, part 2

1938 births
American graphic novelists
20th-century American painters
American male painters
21st-century American painters
Alternative cartoonists
Raw (magazine)
Living people
Artists from Binghamton, New York
Pratt Institute alumni
American male novelists
Novelists from New York (state)
20th-century American male artists